The Man Within is a 1947 British, Technicolor, adventure, crime, drama film, directed by Bernard Knowles and starring Ronald Shiner as Cockney Harry, Michael Redgrave, Jean Kent, Joan Greenwood and Richard Attenborough. In the United States, it was released in a slightly shorter version, retitled The Smugglers. It was produced by Triton Films and Production Film Service. The film was also presented by J. Arthur Rank and the Rank Organisation. The film was adapted from the 1929 novel The Man Within by Graham Greene.

Plot
The story is told from the point of view of Seaman Andrews (Richard Attenborough), the ward of 19th-century smuggler chieftain, Carlyon (Michael Redgrave). Feeling persecuted by his stern disciplinarian guardian, Seaman Andrews jumps ship and turns Carlyon over to the customs officials. A deadly fight ensues, during which both Andrews and Carlyon escape and head their separate ways.

Upon befriending the stepson of a customs agent who was killed by Carlyon, Andrews agrees to testify against his onetime friend and protector in court. To bind the bargain, Lucy (Jean Kent), mistress of the Crown's Attorney, makes love to the impressionable, misguided Andrews. Finally realizing that the forces of justice are no more ethical than his fellow smugglers, Andrews refuses to testify against Carlyon, and is himself thrown into prison. However, a happy ending results from all this intrigue.

Cast
Michael Redgrave - Richard Carlyon  
Jean Kent - Lucy
Joan Greenwood - Elizabeth 
Richard Attenborough - Francis Andrews
Francis L. Sullivan - Braddock
Felix Aylmer - Priest 
Ronald Shiner - Cockney Harry
Ernest Thesiger - Farne
David Horne - Dr Stanton 
Ralph Truman - Prison Interrogator
Allan Jeayes - Judge
Basil Sydney - Sir Henry Merriman
Danny Green - Hake
George Merritt - Hilliard
Lyn Evans - Warder
Herbert Lomas - Farmer
Cyril Chamberlain - Runner
Charles Rolfe - Court Usher
Maurice Denham - Smugglers
Pete Murray 
David Stringer
John Olson - Junior Counsel
Torin Thatcher - Jailer

Reception
The film lost an estimated £6,500.

Greene later described the film as "terrible".

References

External links 
 
 
 
Review of film at Variety

1947 films
1940s adventure drama films
1947 crime drama films
British adventure drama films
British crime drama films
Films based on British novels
Films based on works by Graham Greene
Films directed by Bernard Knowles
Films produced by Sydney Box
Films scored by Clifton Parker
Films with screenplays by Muriel Box
Films with screenplays by Sydney Box
1940s English-language films
1940s British films